As of 2017, there are 13 nature national parks (IUCN Category II) in Kyrgyzstan occupying 724,670.2 hectares.  The first park - Kyrgyz National Park Ala-Archa - was established in 1976.

References

Kyrgyzstan
 
protected areas
National parks